This Is Where I Leave You is a 2014 American comedy-drama film directed by Shawn Levy and starring Jason Bateman, Tina Fey, Adam Driver, Rose Byrne, Corey Stoll, Kathryn Hahn, Connie Britton, Timothy Olyphant, Dax Shepard, and Jane Fonda. It is based on the 2009 novel of the same title by Jonathan Tropper, who also wrote the film's screenplay. This Is Where I Leave You tells the story of four grown siblings who are forced to return to their childhood home after their father passes away and live under the same roof for seven days, along with their over-sharing mother and an assortment of spouses, exes, and might-have-beens. The film was released on September 19, 2014, and grossed $41.3 million against a $19.8 million production budget.

Plot
Judd Altman finds out his wife Quinn has been having an affair with his boss Wade for a year. After he moves out, his sister Wendy calls to tell him their father Mort has died. 

The Altmans gather for the funeral at their mother's home where they reconnect with Wendy's ex-boyfriend Horry Callen, who suffered a brain injury years before, and his mother Linda. Wendy is unhappy because her workaholic husband Barry neglects her. Judd reunites with his older brother Paul and Paul's wife Annie, who had once been Judd's girlfriend. The youngest brother, Phillip, arrives late with his new, older girlfriend, Tracy.

The Altmans' mother Hilary tells her children their father, though an atheist, wanted them to sit shiva, presided over by the Altmans' childhood friend, Rabbi Charles "Boner" Grodner. Wendy is the only one in the family who knows about Judd's marital problems. Judd also reunites with Penny Moore, a woman who had a crush on him in high school.

During a family gathering, Wendy drunkenly badgers Judd to tell the truth about Quinn. Phillip laments being seen as the family screw-up, while flirting with another woman in front of Tracy. Judd blurts out that Quinn was cheating on him and he plans to divorce her. Quinn shows up the next day and reveals she's pregnant with Judd's child. Phillip finds out about the pregnancy and reveals this to the family.

Judd spends the night with Penny, and then spends the day with her. Wendy visits Horry in his backyard, and expresses remorse over the accident that caused Horry's brain injury. The family goes to temple, where the brothers sneak out to smoke joints Judd found in his father's suit. Annie, upset that she and Paul haven't conceived, tries to seduce Judd in hopes that he will impregnate her, but he rejects her. A few days later, after Barry leaves for a conference, Wendy has sex with Horry, with whom she is still in love.

Quinn calls Judd out of fear that she is having a miscarriage, and he admits to Penny that Quinn is pregnant. Judd gets to the hospital to be with Quinn where Wade also shows up. The baby, which is revealed to be a girl, survives. Judd and Wade get into a fight in the waiting room. When Philip and Wendy arrive, she punches Wade in the face, and Judd gets a group of young men who witnessed the confrontation to flip Wade’s car. As he leaves, Wade tells Judd he's not ready to be a step-dad and leaves Quinn. Judd informs her that even though their marriage is over and they cannot get back together, he will support her in raising their daughter when the baby is born.

The next day, Tracy talks with Judd and decides to break up with Phillip. Judd drives to Penny's to talk to her, but she won't listen. Later, Annie apologizes to Judd, tearfully confessing that she is frustrated that she can't get pregnant. Judd replies that she should focus on what she and Paul do have. Paul sees Judd hugging her and assumes Judd is hitting on her. 

Paul attacks Judd as Tracy leaves Phillip, resulting in the three brothers fighting. Hilary silences everyone by kissing Linda passionately. She informs them that she and Linda are in love and that they had Mort's blessing. She admits the shiva was her idea, in order to come out to her children and get them to reconnect. The siblings are shocked, but see their mother is happy and accept it.

One night, when the power goes out in the basement, Judd attempts to fix the fusebox, only to receive an electric shock and be knocked out. He dreams of a childhood memory of falling off his bike and of Mort comforting him. Judd wakes up crying, finally mourning his father.

Judd apologizes to Penny for not being honest and promises to call her. Realizing that they’re in love with each other, Judd and Penny kiss passionately as they embrace. Wendy leaves with her two children, tearing up as she again leaves Horry. The brothers reconcile and Paul offers Phillip a job at their father's sporting goods store. Judd quietly slips out, steals Phillip's Porsche, and drives up the highway to Maine, where he had dreamed of going.

Cast
 Jason Bateman as Judd Altman, the middle boy of the four Altman siblings. He is married to Quinn, whom he recently caught cheating on him with his boss
Oakes Fegley as Young Judd
 Tina Fey as Wendy Altman, the second-oldest of the four siblings; she is a responsible mother who is married to Barry and has two kids. She is the ex-girlfriend of her childhood friend Horry
 Jane Fonda as Hilary Altman, the widowed mother of Judd, Phillip, Wendy, and Paul. She is a celebrity psychologist and writer
 Adam Driver as Phillip Altman, the youngest of the four siblings; the playboy of the family who thinks he is an entrepreneur
 Rose Byrne as Penny Moore, who had a crush on Judd in high school.  He claims that he did not date her at the time because she was just a kid
 Corey Stoll as Paul Altman, the oldest of the four siblings; the no-nonsense brother who is responsible for the family business. He is married to Annie
 Kathryn Hahn as Annie Altman, Paul's wife, and Judd's ex-girlfriend. She and Paul have been trying to conceive
 Connie Britton as Tracy Sullivan, Phillip's girlfriend, and ex-therapist
 Timothy Olyphant as Horry Callen, Wendy's ex-boyfriend, who lives with his mother across the street from the Altman family home due to a brain injury sustained from a car accident when he and Wendy were younger
 Dax Shepard as Wade Beaufort, a shock jock radio personality and Judd's former boss
 Debra Monk as Linda Callen, the Altmans' neighbor, mother of Horry, and Hilary's best friend/romantic partner
 Abigail Spencer as Quinn Altman, Judd's wife
 Ben Schwartz as Rabbi Charles "Boner" Grodner, the town's young rabbi
 Aaron Lazar as Barry Weissman
 Will Swenson as Younger Mort

Production
This is Where I Leave You began principal photography on May 13, 2013 in New York City. The home is located in Munsey Park on Long Island. The skating rink was in The Bellmores, New York. The synagogue interior and exterior scenes were actually shot at Congregation Kneses Tifereth Israel in Port Chester, New York. Approximately 40 members of the congregation played extras in the scenes.

Music
On October 9, 2013, Michael Giacchino was hired to score the film. On August 25, 2014, it was announced that WaterTower Music would release a soundtrack album for the film on September 16, 2014.

Track listing

Additional music
"How Do U Want It" by 2Pac
"Ruff Ryders' Anthem" by DMX
"Bitch Betta Have My Money" by AMG
"Better Man" by Pearl Jam

Marketing
On May 15, 2014 Entertainment Weekly revealed a still from the film featuring the whole cast. On May 28, 2014 the first trailer was released.

Release
This Is Where I Leave You grossed $34.3 million in North America and $6.7 million in other territories for a total gross of $41 million, against its budget of about $20 million.

In its opening weekend, the film grossed $11.6 million, finishing 3rd at the box office behind fellow new releases The Maze Runner ($32.5 million) and A Walk Among the Tombstones ($12.8 million).

Reception
On Rotten Tomatoes, the film holds a critics rating of 44%, based on 167 reviews, with an average rating of 5.47/10. The audience rating is higher at 60%. The site's consensus reads, "This Is Where I Leave You has its moments, but given the amount of talent assembled onscreen, the rather pedestrian results can't help but feel like a letdown." On Metacritic, the film has a score of 44 out of 100, based on 39 critics, indicating "mixed or average reviews". Audiences polled by CinemaScore gave the film an average grade of "B+" on an A+ to F scale.

Home media
The film was released on DVD and Blu-ray December 16, 2014.

References

External links
 
 

2014 films
2014 comedy-drama films
21 Laps Entertainment films
American comedy-drama films
Dune Entertainment films
Films directed by Shawn Levy
Films scored by Michael Giacchino
Films about dysfunctional families
Films about siblings
Films about grieving
Films about Jews and Judaism
Films based on American novels
Warner Bros. films
Films set in 2014
Films set in New York (state)
Films shot in New York City
2010s English-language films
2010s American films